Vrtlinska is a village in the municipality Čazma, Bjelovar-Bilogora County in Croatia. According to the 2001 census, there are 222 inhabitants, in 76 of family households.

Vrtlinska is located on the north-western slopes of Moslavačka gora.

References 

Populated places in Bjelovar-Bilogora County